Spišský Hrušov is a village and municipality in the Spišská Nová Ves District in the Košice Region of central-eastern Slovakia. In 2011 had 1,266 inhabitants

History

The village was founded before the 12th century in the former Hungarian Szepes County (Szepes is Hungarian for beautiful). The first historical records of its existence are from 1253. The village name is derived from the Slovak word for pear (hruška) and its former Hungarian names incorporated the equivalent Hungarian word for pear of "körte". Local folklore refers to a large pear tree located on a nearby hill that was supposed to have had mysterious powers. The tree is now gone but the story lives on. The coat of arms of the village is a tree on a hill with four pears on its branches.

Below is a chronology of the former Hungarian, German, and Slovak names of present day Spišský Hrušov:
1253 - Kurtues, Kurtueles
1255 - Kurtuelus
1294 - Horusk, Hurusk
1360-1364 - Hruschfálva, Hruskfálva, Hruskafálva
1368 - Grussov
1386 - Graucza
1495 - Grawss
1500 - Hrussow
1773 - Körtvélyes, Körtvélesz, Bierndorff, Grossow
1786 - Körtwélyesch, Birndorf, Hrussow
1808 - Körtvélyes, Birndorf, Grausch, Hrussow
1863-1902 - Körtvélyes
1907-1918 - Szepeskörtvélyes
1920 - Hrušov
1927 - Spišský Hrušov

Next to the town hall is the Gothic style Roman Catholic church of St. Catherine of Alexandria (Kostol svätá Kataríny Alexandrijskej). It was built in the late 13th century, rebuilt in the 17th and 18th centuries, renovated in 1900 and again in 1951. The Chapel of St. Sofia (Kaplnka svätá Žofie) adjoins the northeast side of the church.

The only industry in Spišský Hrušov is BIO-plus, s.r.o, a company that manufactures motor fuel from organic plant material. It is located at the northeast end of a road that follows a tributary of the Lodina River that runs through the village.

Geography
It has a population of about 1,200 people. The surrounding land is gently rolling fields. A tributary of the Lodina River runs through the village.

References

External links
http://www.obce.info/slovensko/kosicky-kraj/okres-spisska-nova-ves/spissky-hrusov/celok-spissky-hrusov
http://www.urbistat.it/AdminStat/en/sk/demografia/dati-sintesi/spi-sk--hru-ov/20489343/4
http://www.spisskyhrusov.sk

Villages and municipalities in Spišská Nová Ves District